Adel Chbouki (born 3 May 1971) is a Moroccan former footballer. He competed in the men's tournament at the 2000 Summer Olympics.

References

External links
 

1971 births
Living people
Moroccan footballers
Olympic footballers of Morocco
Footballers at the 2000 Summer Olympics
Place of birth missing (living people)
Association football midfielders
Wydad AC players